The United States competed at the 2022 World Aquatics Championships in Budapest, Hungary from 18 June to 3 July.

Medalists

Artistic swimming 

Women

Mixed

Diving 

On May 19, 2022, 16 athletes were named to the World Championships roster.

Men

Women

Mixed

Open water swimming 
On May 28, 2022, 9 athletes were named to the world championships roster.

 Men

 Women

 Mixed

Swimming 

On May 1, 2022, 41 athletes were named to the World Championships roster. On May 5, the final roster additions were announced.

 Men

 Women

 Mixed

 Legend: (*) = Swimmers who participated in the heat only.

Water polo 

Summary

Men's tournament

Team roster

Group play

Playoffs

Quarterfinals

5–8th place semifinals

Fifth place game

Women's tournament

Team roster

Group play

Quarterfinals

Semifinals

Final

References 

Nations at the 2022 World Aquatics Championships
World Aquatics Championships
2022